Charlemagne was a successful songwriting team made up of James Carmichael, Ronald Miller and Kathy Wakefield that worked for Motown in the 1970s. One of the many hits that were written by this team was “Glasshouse,” the last Top 40 Pop single by The Temptations.

See also
List of songwriter tandems

References

American songwriters
Motown artists
Record production teams
Songwriting teams